The Mr. Science Show was a lecture based science television program for children developed by Tim Perkins, which aired weekly in the 1990s on Time Warner Cable's Public-access television cable TV channel. The program was produced in Melbourne, Florida, United States. The show utilized simple science experiments, silly stories, and stunts to explain specific concepts in science.

History
A Central Florida cable television program titled Cable Goes To School, which was produced by Time Warner Cable, aired a segment introducing a series of live science education shows at a small theatre in Melbourne, Florida. The live science education shows initially were developed to promote The Science Fare science supply stores. After airing the program, which explained magnets and magnetism, the first standalone episodes of The Mr. Science Show were produced to feature additional science topics. With Tim Perkins in the role of Mr. Science, a name bestowed by the children in the audience. The first standalone episodes of the Mr. Science Show were produced with each show featuring an in depth review of a particular science topic.

The Mr. Science Show first aired on Time Warner Cable as a Public-access television show in 1992 with Tim Perkins as Mister Science. In the 60 minute shows Perkins played a science enthusiast who offered several experiments mixed with stories which taught something about a particular area of science. The experiments often involved the children from the audience and were often simple enough to be tried by viewers. The presentations were delivered in a humorous way and there was always something that would go wrong, thus providing viewers with an example of what not to do.

Distribution
The Mr. Science Science Shows were taped live and distributed freely as educational fillers to other Time Warner Cable facilities where they were seen sporadically by audiences in the United States. Over 50 programs were scripted but only a few were actually produced and broadcast. The live tapings were sometimes attended by hundreds of children from Brevard County Public Schools. Some Florida schools used donated footage from The Mr. Science Show for producing Public Service Announcements in their school's television production studios.

See also
 Beakman's World
 Bill Nye the Science Guy
 Bob & Ray
 The Sinbad Show
 Watch Mr. Wizard

References
 Mr. Science makes learning a no-brainer; Entertainer helps demystify subject for kids: Interview With Tim Perkins by Maria Sonnenberg for Florida Today,  January 18, 2005. 3B;  Education,  ID: brv2005012017180147.

External links
 - Official  web site of The Mr. Science Show.
 - PSA on Time Warner Cable: Television Commercial featuring Mr. Science & Fireman Jim
 - Trademark for THE MR. SCIENCE SHOW in Florida;
 - The Mr. Science Show Live at the Hastings Museum (Nebraska)

1992 American television series debuts
1995 American television series endings
1990s American children's television series
1990s American science fiction television series
American children's education television series
Science education television series
Local children's television programming in the United States
American public access television shows